The 2022 Lusorecursos World RX of Portugal was the fourth and fifth round of the ninth season of the FIA World Rallycross Championship. The event was double-header (two races in a weekend) held at the new configuration of Pista Automóvel de Montalegre in Montalegre, Vila Real. Montalegre’s layout has been re-profiled this year, with the old joker lap now the first corner and a new, gravel joker from Turns Two to Five.

World RX1e Championship Race 1 

Source

Heats

Progression 

 Race 1

 Race 2

Semi-finals 

 Semi-Final 1

 Semi-Final 2

 Note: Kevin Hansen progressed to the Final race as one of two placed trird Semi-Finals drivers with better result in Progression Round.

Final

World RX1e Championship Race 2 

Source

Heats

Progression 

 Race 1

 Race 2

Semi-finals 

 Semi-Final 1

 Semi-Final 2

 Note: Timmy Hansen progressed to the Final race as one of two placed trird Semi-Finals drivers with better result in Progression Round.
 Note: Gustav Bergström’s day ended when he was ruled out of the progression race due to a late arrival at pre-grid.

Final 

 Note: Johan Kristoffersson originally finished 1st but got 10 sec penalty for collision with Timmy Hansen on the 1st lap.

Standings after the event 

Source

 Note: Only the top five positions are included.

References 

|- style="text-align:center"
|width="35%"|Previous race:2022 World RX of Riga-Latvia
|width="40%"|FIA World Rallycross Championship2022 season
|width="35%"|Next race:2022 World RX of Benelux
|- style="text-align:center"
|width="35%"|Previous race:2021 World RX of Portugal
|width="40%"|World RX of Portugal
|width="35%"|Next race:-
|- style="text-align:center"

Portugal
World RX
World RX of Portugal